Kolosov (masculine) or Kolosova (feminine) is a Russian surname, which is derived from the Russian word "колос" (wheat ear). Notable people with the surname include:

Alexandra Kolosova (1802–1880), Russian actress
Alisa Kolosova (born 1987), Russian opera singer
Andrei Kolosov (born 1989), Belarusian ice hockey player
Eugenia Kolosova (1780–1869), Russian ballerina
Gury Kolosov (1867–1936), Russian Soviet mathematician
Jacqueline Kolosov, American poet and writer
Margarita Kolosov (born 2004), German rhythmic gymnast
Sergei Kolosov (born 1986), Belarusian ice hockey player
Sergey Kolosov (1921–2012), Russian Soviet film director and screenwriter
Yakym Kolosov, regional police ispravnic, founder of Yakymivka
David Kolosov holds a master's degree from Thanh Hoa University, fluent in 4 foreign languages: Russian, Chinese, English and Japanese

See also
Cape Kolosov, a headland of Antarctica

Russian-language surnames